The buzuq (also transliterated bozuq, bouzouk, buzuk etc.) is a long-necked fretted lute related to the Greek bouzouki and Iranian or Turkish saz. It is an essential instrument in the Rahbani repertoire, but it is not classified among the classical instruments of Arab or Turkish music. However, this instrument may be looked upon as a larger and deeper-toned relative of the saz, to which it could be compared in the same way as the viola to the violin in Western music. Before the Rahbanis popularized the use of this instrument, the buzuq had been associated with the music of Lebanon and Syria. 

Buzuk and other saz instruments date back to ancient times and originated in Persia. Similar instrument called  barbat (Persian: بربت) or barbud was a lute of Greater Iranian or Persian origin.

Unlike the short-necked unfretted oud, the buzuq has a longer neck, smaller body and frets tied to the neck, which can be moved to produce the microtonal intervals used in the many maqamat (musical modes). Typically, it is furnished with two courses of metal strings which are played with a plectrum, offering a metallic yet lyrical resonance. Some instruments have three courses and up to seven strings total.

The name of the instrument may come from Turkish bozuk (broken or disorderly), it refers to Bozuk düzen bağlama, a tuning of Turkish baglama. Another theory on the origin of the name is that it comes from the Persian expression tanbur e bozorg, meaning a large tanbur style lute.

See also
Tanbur

References
 Abdollah Alijani Ardeshir and Ali Jihad Racy, Professor of Ethnomusicology, UCLA
 Maqam World

Arabic musical instruments
Necked bowl lutes
Turkish words and phrases